The 2021 Campeonato da Primeira Divisão de Futebol Profissional da FGF - Divisão Especial - Série A1, better known as the 2021 Campeonato Gaúcho (officially the Gauchão Ipiranga 2021 for sponsorship reasons), was the 101st season of Rio Grande do Sul's top flight football league. The competition was played from 27 February to 23 May 2021. 12 clubs contested in the Campeonato Gaúcho. Grêmio were the three-time defending champion and successfully defended their title.

Teams
A total of 12 teams competed in the 2021 Série A1 season.

First stage

Table

Results

Positions by matchday
The table lists the positions of teams after each matchday.

Knockout stage

Semi-finals
The first legs will be played on 2 May, and the second legs will be played on 8 and 9 May 2021.

|}

Match C1

Grêmio advances to the finals.

Match C2

Internacional advances to the finals.

Finals
The first legs will be played on 16 May, and the second legs will be played on 23 May 2021.

|}

Match G1

Grêmio win the finals.

Overall table

Awards

Statistics

Scoring
First goal of the season: Jean Silva for Ypiranga-RS against São Luiz at Matchday 1 of First stage (27 February 2021)

Top scorers

Last updated: 24 May 2021.Source: Soccerway.

Hat-tricks

Last updated: 24 May 2021.Source: Soccerway.

Clean sheets

Last updated: 24 May 2021.Source: Soccerway.

Discipline

Player
Yellow cards

Red cards

Last updated: 10 May 2021.Source: Soccerway.

Team
Yellow cards

Red cards

Last updated: 10 May 2021.Source: Soccerway.

Notes

References

Campeonato Gaúcho seasons
Gaúcho